Budzyno-Walędzięta  is a village in the administrative district of Gmina Czerwonka, within Maków County, Masovian Voivodeship, in east-central Poland.

The village has a population of 240.

References

Villages in Maków County